The men's tournament of the rugby sevens at the 2022 South American Games was held from 7 to 9 October 2022 at the Estadio Héroes de Curupayty in Luque, Paraguay, a sub-venue outside Asunción. It was the third edition of the rugby sevens men's tournament at the South American Games since its first appeareance in Santiago 2014.

The tournament served as qualifier for the 2023 Pan American Games, with the top two teams (excluding Chile) qualifying to the men's rugby sevens tournament.

Argentina won the gold medal and their second South American Games men's rugby sevens title after beating the defending champions Chile 19–7 in the final. Uruguay beat Brazil with a 19–12 score to win the bronze medal.

Argentina and Uruguay qualified for the 2023 Pan American Games as the Sudamérica Rugby representatives, besides Chile which qualified automatically as hosts.

Schedule
The tournament was held over a 3-day period, from 7 to 9 October.

Teams
A total of nine ODESUR NOCs entered teams for the men's tournament.

Rosters

Each participating NOC had to enter a roster of 12 players (Technical manual Article 9).

Venue
All matches were played at the Estadio Héroes de Curupayty located within the Parque Olímpico cluster in Luque, Paraguay and owned by the Paraguayan Olympic Committee. The Estadio Héroes de Curupayty, which was remodeled in 2020, has a capacity for 3,000 spectators.

Results
All match times are in PYST (UTC−3).

Preliminary round
The preliminary round consisted of a single group of 7 teams in which each team played once against the other 6 teams in the group on a round-robin format. The fifth and sixth placed teams advanced to play for the fifth place, the third and fourth placed teams advanced to the bronze medal match and the first and second placed teams advanced to the gold medal match.

Standings

Matches

Final stage
The final stage consisted of the fifth place match, the bronze medal match and the gold medal match.

Fifth place match

Bronze medal match

Gold medal match

Final ranking

Medalists

Qualified teams for Pan American Games
The following four teams from Sudamérica Rugby qualified for the 2023 Pan American Games women's rugby sevens tournament, including Chile which qualified as hosts.

1 Bold indicates champions for that year. Italic indicates hosts for that year.

References

External links
 ASU2022 Rugby sevens Teams Male at ASU2022 official website.

Rugby sevens